Via Galactica is a rock musical with a book by Christopher Gore and Judith Ross, lyrics by Gore, and music by Galt MacDermot. It marked the Broadway debut of actor Mark Baker.

Originally entitled Up!, it offers a futuristic story of social outcasts living on an asteroid in the year 2972. Among them is Gabriel Finn, a space sanitation man who collects trash in a clamshell-shaped garbage ship called the Helen of Troy.

The storyline was so incomprehensible that at the last moment producers decided to insert a plot synopsis in the Playbill, but audiences were still baffled by what they were witnessing unfold on stage. Pyrotechnic displays and other special effects did little to enhance the project.

After fifteen previews, the Broadway production, directed by Peter Hall, produced by George W. George and choreographed by George Faison, opened on November 28, 1972, the first production at the brand-new Uris Theatre where, unable to withstand a universal assault by the critics, it ran for only seven performances. The cast included Raul Julia, Irene Cara, Keene Curtis, Chuck Cissel, Ralph Carter, Melanie Chartoff, and Virginia Vestoff.

Via Galactica, one of the first Broadway shows to lose more than $1 million, was MacDermot's second flop of the season. His Dude had closed after 16 performances five weeks earlier.

Songs

Act One

 "Via Galactica" (Storyteller)
 "We Are One" (Blue People)
 "Helen of Troy" (Gabriel Finn)
 "Oysters" (Hels and April)
 "The Other Side of the Sky" (Hels)
 "Children of the Sun" (Omaha)
 "Different" (April and Company)
 "Take Your Hat Off" (Omaha and Company)
 "Ilmar's Tomb" (Omaha)
 "Shall We Friend?" (Gabriel Finn)
 "The Lady Isn't Looking" (Omaha)
 "Hush" (Gabriel Finn)
 "Cross on Over" (Dr. Isaacs, Omaha and Company)
 "The Gospel of Gabriel Finn" (Gabriel Finn)

Act Two

 "Terre Haute High" (April)
 "Life Wins" (Omaha)
 "The Worm Germ" (Provo)
 "Isaacs' Equation" (Dr. Isaacs)
 "Dance the Dark Away!" (Storyteller and Company)
 "Four Hundred Girls Ago" (Gabriel Finn)
 "All My Good Mornings" (Omaha)
 "Isaacs' Equation (Reprise)" (Dr. Isaacs)
 "Children of the Sun (Reprise)" (Omaha and Gabriel Finn)
 "New Jerusalem" (Company)

References

Broadway Musicals: A Hundred Year History by David H. Lewis, published by McFarland & Company (2002), pages 104-105
Not Since Carrie: Forty Years of Broadway Musical Flops by Ken Mandelbaum, published by St. Martin's Press (1998), pages 23–24

External links

 
 
 Jennifer George, "My Family's Flop", The New York Times, January 2, 2011.
 BroadwayEdition.org host Paul Leary's Exclusive interview about Via Galactica with Rick Gore: http://www.paulleary.org/web/Home/Entries/2011/1/7_Exclusive_interview_about_Via_Galactica.html

1972 musicals
Broadway musicals
Musicals by Galt MacDermot
Original musicals
Science fiction musicals